The Sherman Arcade is located at 228 Harrison Avenue, Panama City, Bay County, Florida.

Constructed in 1934, the two story masonry vernacular arcade has Mission Revival elements, and is of brick construction surfaced with stucco.

It was built by Panama City businessman W. C. Sherman.  He used wood salvaged from the old German American Lumber Company and bricks from his dry kiln in Millville.

It was gutted and restored to its original design in 2003.

It houses retail businesses on the first floor and residential apartments on the second floor.

On September 9, 1998, it was added to the U.S. National Register of Historic Places.

References

External links
 Bay County listings at National Register of Historic Places

Buildings and structures in Panama City, Florida
National Register of Historic Places in Bay County, Florida